Anger of the Dead (also known as ) is a 2015 Italian zombie film written and directed by Francesco Picone.

Plot 
After a zombie apocalypse, Alice, who is pregnant, seeks to find a safer place to live.  Along the way, she discovers a mute woman being held prisoner by the merciless Captain Rooker, a member of a rogue paramilitary group that desires to use naturally immune women to repopulate the world by sexual slavery.

Cast 
 Aaron Stielstra as Captain Rooker
 Marius Bizau as Stephen
 Desiree Giorgetti as Prisoner
 Michael Segal as Peter
 Roberta Sparta as Alice
 David White as Ben
 Claudio Camilli as Hulk
 Chiara Paoli as Allie

Release 
In the United States, Anger of the Dead was released theatrically on 8 January and on DVD on 2 February 2016.

Reception 
Writing for The Hollywood Reporter, Frank Scheck described the film as a rip-off of The Walking Dead that has poor editing and cheap special effects.  Martin Tsai of the Los Angeles Times wrote that the film "reveals particularly misogynistic and misanthropic filmmaking".  Matt Boiselle of Dread Central called it "definitely worth the view-time" despite his initial misgivings over watching a horror film produced by Uwe Boll.  Although Bloody Disgustings reviewer Trace Thurman wrote that Anger of the Dead is "a poorly-scripted and poorly-acted slog of a film", he described Picone as "quite a talented director" and complimented the cinematography, which he said makes the film "somewhat watchable".

References

External links 
 

2015 films
2015 horror films
Italian horror films
English-language Italian films
2010s English-language films